Historia National Geographic is a Spanish language history magazine published in Barcelona, Spain. It is an offshoot of National Geographic magazine and was started in 2003. The publisher of the magazine is RBA Editores.

The magazine covers articles about the past civilizations and leading figures of the ancient world with the spectacular National Geographic photographs.

An Italian edition of Historia National Geographic entitled Storica National Geographic was launched by RBA Italia, a subsidiary of the RBA Editores, in February 2009.

In 2008 Historia National Geographic sold 160,000 copies.

References

External links

2003 establishments in Spain
History magazines
Magazines established in 2003
Magazines published in Barcelona
Spanish-language magazines